Philippe Henri, Marquis de Ségur (20 January 1724 – 3 October 1801) was a grandson of Philippe II, Duke of Orléans, nobleman, Marshal of France, and Secretary of State for War under Louis XV and later Louis XVI.

Biography
Born in Paris, son of Henri François, comte de Ségur and his wife Philippe Angélique de Froissy, Philippe Henri was appointed to the command of an infantry regiment at eighteen, and served under his father in Italy and Bohemia. He was wounded at Roucoux in Flanders in October 1746, and lost an arm at Lauffeld in 1747. In 1748 he succeeded his father as lieutenant-general of Champagne and Brie; he also received in 1753 the governorship of the county of Foix.

During the Seven Years' War he fought at Hastenbeck (1757), Krefeld (1758) and Minden (1759). In 1760 he was taken prisoner at Kloster Kampen.

The ability which he showed in the government of Franche-Comté in 1775 led in 1780 to his appointment as Minister for War under Necker. He created in 1783 the permanent general staff, and made admirable regulations with regard to barracks and military hospitals; and though he was officially responsible for the reactionary decree requiring four quarterings of nobility as a condition for the appointment of officers, the scheme is said not to have originated with him and to have been adopted under protest. On 13 June 1783 he became a marshal of France. He resigned from the ministry of war in 1787.

During the Terror he was imprisoned in La Force, and after his release was reduced to considerable straits until in 1800 he received a pension from Napoleon. He died in Paris the next year.

Family
Ségur married in Paris on 3 February 1749 Louise Anne Madeleine de Vernon (Paris, 1729 – Paris, 12 March 1778), daughter of Alexandre de Vernon and Anne du Vivier, and had two sons:
 Louis Philippe, comte de Ségur (Paris, 10 December 1753 – Paris, 27 August 1830), diplomat and historian
 Joseph Alexandre Pierre de Ségur, Viscount of Ségur (Paris, 14 April 1756 – Bagnères-de-Bigorre, 27 July 1805), poet, songwriter and playwright; he was actually the son of his best friend Pierre Victor, baron de Besenval de Brünstatt

Titles & Decorations 

  Knight of the Holy Spirit effective 7 June 1767.

Footnotes

References
A. de Ségur, Le Marechal de Ségur, 1724–1801 (Paris, 1895).

Philippe Henri, marquis de
Segur, Philippe Henri, marquis de
Segur, Philippe Henri, marquis de
Segur, Philippe Henri, marquis de
Segur
French military personnel of the Seven Years' War
People from Paris